George Read (August 13, 1819 – March 29, 1903) was an Ontario businessman and political figure. He represented Peterborough East in the Legislative Assembly of Ontario as a Conservative member from 1867 to 1874.

He was born in Augusta Township in Upper Canada in 1819, the son of United Empire Loyalists who settled in Grenville County. He served as clerk and treasurer for Otonabee Township. He died there in 1903.

References

External links 

The Canadian parliamentary companion and annual register, 1873, HJ Morgan

1819 births
1903 deaths
Progressive Conservative Party of Ontario MPPs